Albert Barillé (14 February 1920 – 5 February 2009) was a French television producer, creator, screenwriter, cartoonist, and founder of Procidis. He is the creator of the puppet animated series Les Aventures de Colargol, and the series Once Upon a Time.... He was also an author of medical documentaries, theater pieces, and popularized philosophy.

Filmography
Les Aventures de Colargol (1970)
Once Upon a Time...
Once Upon a Time... Man (1978)
Once Upon a Time... Space (1982)
Once Upon a Time... Life (1987)
Once Upon a Time... The Americas (1992)
Once Upon a Time... The Discoverers (1994)
Once Upon a Time... The Explorers (1997)
Once Upon a Time... Planet Earth (2008)

See also
Wild Instinct

References

External links

  Biography on Cinemotions.com
 
  Procidis.com

1920 births
2009 deaths
People from Warsaw
French animators
French film producers
French animated film producers
French animated film directors
French television producers
French television directors
French cartoonists
French puppeteers
French male screenwriters
20th-century French screenwriters
Once Upon a Time...
Polish emigrants to France
20th-century French male writers